Aframomum thonneri is a species of plant in the ginger family, Zingiberaceae. It was first described by Émile Auguste Joseph De Wildeman.

Range
Aframomum thonneri is native to the Democratic Republic of the Congo.

References

thonneri
Flora of the Democratic Republic of the Congo
Taxa named by Émile Auguste Joseph De Wildeman